Mount Teon is an elongated island in the Banda Sea, Indonesia. Explosive eruptions have been recorded from the volcano since the seventeenth century.

See also 

 List of volcanoes in Indonesia

References 

Volcanoes of the Lesser Sunda Islands
Stratovolcanoes of Indonesia
Active volcanoes
Islands of the Maluku Islands
Holocene stratovolcanoes